Rimonim, is an Israeli settlement in the West Bank.

Rimonim or Rimmonim may also refer to:

Torah rimonim (or simply "rimonim"), finials adorning the top ends of the rollers of a Torah scroll
Rimonim, a magazine of the Center for Jewish Art, Israel
Rimonim hotels, a chain owned by Israel Land Development Company
Rimonim Prison in Tel Mond, Israel; part of the Israel Prison Service

See also

Rimon (disambiguation)
Rimmon